Blas de Prado, or Del Prado, was a Spanish painter, who was born in the vicinity of Toledo, about 1540, and was a scholar of Alonso Berruguete. There are some of his works in the chapel of St. Blas at Toledo, but they are much injured by time and the dampness of the situation. At Madrid there are also some pictures by this artist, particularly an altar-piece in the church of San Pedro, representing the 'Descent from the Cross,' which is evidently the work of a great master. In the early part of his life Prado was invited to visit the court of the Emperor of Morocco, to paint a portrait of his daughter, and returned to Spain amply rewarded for his labour. Whilst at Fez he painted the portraits of the Princesses of the Harem. He died at Madrid about 1600.

References
 
Antonio Palomino, An account of the lives and works of the most eminent Spanish painters, sculptors and architects, 1724, first English translation, 1739, p. 5

Year of birth unknown
1599 deaths
16th-century Spanish painters
Spanish male painters
People from Toledo, Spain